Leixões Sport Club, commonly known as Leixões, is a Portuguese sports club from Matosinhos. It is organised into several departments for many sports, such as football, boxing, karate, volleyball, swimming and billiards. It is most well known for its professional football department.

Leixões won the 1960–61 Taça de Portugal.

History 
Leixões Sport Club was founded in 1907, making them one of Portugal's oldest sports clubs in continuous operation. In 1961, they won their only Taça de Portugal, defeating Porto 2–0. This qualified Leixões to the 1961–62 European Cup Winners' Cup, in which they reached the quarter-finals before losing 4–2 on aggregate to East German side Motor Jena. Leixões had their best top-flight league performance in 1962–63, finishing fifth, 12 points behind champions Benfica.

Present in the top-flight since 1959–60, Leixões were relegated on goal difference in the 1976–77 season. Apart from the 1988–89 season, Leixões did not play in the top-flight again until 2007.

In 2002, Leixões beat Braga 3–1 away to secure a place in the Taça de Portugal final (the first and only third division club to play a final) against Sporting CP. The club, however, lost 1–0, but nonetheless secured a spot in the following season's UEFA Cup and Portuguese Supercup after Sporting had also finished as national champions for the year. The following season, Leixões lost the Portuguese Supercup against Sporting CP by 5–1. That same year, Leixões lost 5–3 on aggregate to Greek side PAOK after winning the first leg 2–1 at home, thus suffering elimination in the first round of the UEFA Cup. They also romped to the Segunda Divisão B title with 94 points and with it they gained promotion to the Segunda Liga.

In 2004, they just avoided relegation back to Division Two and finished 14th. A year later, they battled to finish seventh in the league. Finally in 2006, they nearly reached the top-flight Primeira Liga, losing out to Desportivo das Aves in the promotion chase by finishing third, two points behind Aves. Third place used to merit a promotion, but due to a re-construction to all leagues, it meant only the top two would go up (Beira-Mar as champions and Aves as runners-up). Finally, in 2007, they gained promotion to the Liga, 18 years after their relegation. During this stint, which lasted three seasons, their best result was a sixth-place finish in 2008–09. Their last match in the Primeira Liga was a 1–0 away loss to Olhanense on 2 May 2010.

Stadium 

Leixões' home ground, the Estádio do Mar, was inaugurated on 1 January 1964 with a match against Benfica, who won 4–0.

Honours 
Taça de Portugal: 1
1960–61

 Segunda Liga: 1
2006–07

 Segunda Divisão: 1
1937–38

Segunda Divisão B: 1
 2002–03

 Campeonato do Porto: 1
 1939–40

 Taça AF Porto: 1
 1982–83

Youth honours 

 Nacional Juniores A 1ª Divisão(U19): 1
 1941–42

 AF Porto Jun.A 1ª Divisão(U19 B): 3
 2009–10, 2016–17, 2018–19

 AF Porto Juniores D T. Joaquim Piedade(U13): 1
 2010–11

Players

Current squad

Out on loan

Notable former players

 António Frasco
 Álvaro Magalhães
 Frederico Rosa
 Joel Dias
 Ricardo Nascimento
 Rui Duarte
 Beto
 Jorge Gonçalves
 Diogo Valente
 Vieirinha
 Filipe Oliveira
 João Moreira
 Vítor Castanheira
 Nuno Laranjeiro
 Zé Manel
 Fernando Alexandre
 Nelson Benítez
 Hans-Peter Berger
 Nail Besirović
 Brasília
 Élvis
 Leandro Tatu
 Roberto
 Jaime
 Ezequias
 Derick Poloni
 Tales Schutz
 Wesley
 Roberto Souza
 Chumbinho
 Wênio
 Herve Xavier Zengue
 Christian Pouga
 Brayan Angulo
 Amine Oudhiri
 Phil Walker
 Rubén Belima
 Edmond Tapsoba
 Dionisio Mendes
 Jean Sony
 Udo Nwoko
 Brandon Poltronieri
 Lê Công Vinh
Detinho
Anastasios Tsoumagas
 Bill Roffey

Managerial history 

  József Szabó (1957–1958)
  Óscar Marques (1960)
  José Valle (1960–1961)
  Filpo Nunez (1961)
  António Teixeira (1967–1970)
  António Teixeira (1972–1974)
  José Rachão (1982–1984)
  Acácio Casimiro (1986–1987)
  Henrique Calisto (1990–1991)
  Amândio Barreiras (1991)
  Manuel Barbosa (1991–1993)
  Nicolau Vaqueiro (1993)
  Vieira Nunes (1993–1994)
  Henrique Calisto (1994)
  Ruben Cunha (1994)
  Acácio Casimiro (1994–1995)
  Álvaro Carolino (1995)
  António Caldas (1996–1997)
  Ruben Cunha (1997–1998)
  Eduard Eranosyan (1998)
  Rúben Cunha (1998–1999)
  José Alberto Torres (1999–2000)
  António Pinto (June, 2000 – Jan 25, 2001)
  Adelino Teixeira (Jan 25, 2001 – May 26, 2001)
  Carlos Carvalhal (June 8, 2001 – Dec 9, 2002)
  Abílio Novais (Dec 12, 2002 – Nov 5, 2003)
  João Alves (Nov 5, 2003 – Jan 12, 2004)
  António Pinto (Jan 12, 2004 – May 12, 2004)
  José Gomes (June, 2004–May, 2005)
  Rogério Gonçalves (June 11, 2005 – Feb 21, 2006)
  Vítor Oliveira (Feb 22, 2006 – May 20, 2007)
  Carlos Brito (May 26, 2007 – Feb 9, 2008)
  António Pinto (Feb 9, 2008 – May 21, 2008)
  José Mota (May 21, 2008 – Feb 9, 2010)
  Fernando Castro Santos (Feb 9, 2010 – May 8, 2010)
  Augusto Inácio (May 21, 2010 – Feb 13, 2011)
  Litos (Feb 16, 2011 – Feb 14, 2012)
  Horácio Gonçalves (Feb 15, 2012 – Nov 6, 2012)
  Pedro Correia (Nov 6, 2012 – Mar 3, 2014)
  Jorge Casquilha (Mar 6, 2014 – May 11, 2014)
  Horácio Gonçalves (July 1, 2014 – June 30, 2015)
  Manuel Monteiro (July 1, 2015 – Nov 22, 2015)
  Pedro Miguel (Nov 29, 2015 – Jun 30, 2016)
  Filipe Coelho (July 1, 2016 – Oct 30, 2016)
  Daniel Kenedy (Nov 13, 2016 – Aug 19, 2017)
  João Henriques (Aug 23, 2017 – Jan 6, 2018)
  Ricardo Malafaia (Jan 14, 2018 – Apr 7, 2018)
  Francisco Chaló (Apr 11, 2018 – Jun 30, 2018)
  Filipe Gouveia (Jul 1, 2018 – Dec 23, 2018)
  Bruno China (Dec 30, 2018)
  Jorge Casquilha (Jan 6, 2019 – Jun 30, 2019)
  Carlos Pinto (Jul 1, 2019 – Jan 18, 2020)
  Manuel Cajuda (Feb 2, 2020 – Jun 30, 2020)
  Tiago Fernandes (Jul 1, 2020 – Oct 4, 2020)
  João Eusébio (Oct 7, 2020 – Jan 6, 2021)
  José Mota (Jan 11, 2021 – Jun 30, 2022)
 Vitor Martins (Jul 1, 2022 – )

European record

League and cup history 
The club has played 25 seasons at the top level of Portuguese football.

CL: Campeonato da Liga (winners weren't considered Portuguese champions)
1D: Primeira Liga and predecessors (1st level)
2H: Liga de Honra and successors (2nd level)
2D.DL1: Segunda Divisão, Douro Litoral Zone, Group 1 (2nd level)
2D.A.2.1: Segunda Divisão, Zone A, Group 2, Sub-Group 1 (2nd level)
2D.A: Segunda Divisão, Zone A (2nd level)
2DN: Segunda Divisão, Northern Zone (until 1990: 2nd level; post-1990: 3rd level)
CWC: Cup Winners' Cup
FC: Fairs Cup
UC: UEFA Cup

 R1: 1st round

 QF: Quarter-final

Other sports 
In addition to football, Leixões also competes in boxing, karate, volleyball, swimming and billiards.

See also 
Leixões SC (volleyball)

References

External links 
  
 Soccerzz
 Zerozero 
Club Profile at LPFP
Club Profile at FPF 

 
Football clubs in Portugal
Association football clubs established in 1907
1907 establishments in Portugal
Taça de Portugal winners
Primeira Liga clubs
Liga Portugal 2 clubs